The following is a list of Michigan State Historic Sites in Genesee County, Michigan. Sites marked with a dagger (†) are also listed on the National Register of Historic Places in Genesee County, Michigan.


Current listings

See also
 National Register of Historic Places listings in Genesee County, Michigan

Sources
 Historic Sites Online – Genesee County. Michigan State Housing Developmental Authority. Accessed January 14, 2011.

References

Genesee County
State Historic Sites
Tourist attractions in Genesee County, Michigan